Meijers is a Dutch occupational surname related to English Mayor.  People with this surname include:

Aaron Meijers (born 1987), Dutch footballer
Bart Meijers (born 1997), Dutch footballer
Debora Meijers (born 1948), Dutch art historian
Eduard Meijers (1880–1954), Dutch jurist and founding father of the current Dutch civil code
Ellen Meijers, Dutch video game music composer 
Eric Meijers (born 1963), Dutch football manager 
:nl:Harie Meijers (1879–1928), Dutch track cyclist
Jeroen Meijers (born 1993), Dutch cyclist
Pauke Meijers (1934–2013), Dutch footballer
Viesturs Meijers (born 1967), Latvian chess player

See also
Meijer, Dutch surname
Meijer, American hypermarket chain
Meyers, English, Dutch, or German surname

Dutch-language surnames
Occupational surnames